Helen of Troy is a figure from Greek mythology:

Helen of Troy may also refer to:
People
 Helen Wellington-Lloyd (born 1954), performer associated with the punk band Sex Pistols and director Derek Jarman, who used the name "Helen of Troy"

Arts, entertainment, and media
 Helen of Troy, New York, a 1923 musical review with songs by Harry Ruby
 Helen of Troy (album), a 1975 album by John Cale
 Helen of Troy (film), a 1956 motion picture
 Helen of Troy (painting), an 1898 painting by Evelyn De Morgan
 Helen of Troy (TV miniseries), a 2003 television miniseries
 "Helen of Troy", a 2013 song on Orchestral Manoeuvres in the Dark's album English Electric
 "Helen of Troy", a 2021 song on Lorde's album Solar Power

Other uses
 Helen of Troy Limited, a manufacturer of personal care products

See also
Helen (disambiguation)
Troy (disambiguation)